This timeline contains the events of the communist rebellion of the year 2016.

Timeline

January 
 January 8 – A NPA rebel accompanied by his mother surrendered to the authorities in Zamboanga del Norte.
 January 20 – The 16th IB arrives in Tandag, Surigao del Sur for deployment against the NPA.
 January 26 – Three soldiers were killed in a gunfight between suspected NPA rebels and soldiers in Kalinga.
 January 30 – The NPA guerillas torched two bulldozers owned by Del Monte Philippines Inc. and a boom sprayer owned by Lapanday Pineapple Plantation Company; including a separate attack which targeted the spray truck of Dole Philippines Inc. in Malaybalay, Bukidnon.

February 
 February 3 – Two separate clashes between government troops and NPA rebels occurred in Pantukan, Compostela Valley resulting in 3 soldiers killed.
 February 7 – The North Cotabato provincial government security chief and his bodyguard were killed by three NPA gunmen.
 February 9 – The NPA claimed responsibility for killing the head of North Cotabato province's civil security unit and his bodyguard.
 February 9–10 – Two separate clashes occurred in Compostela Valley between government forces and NPA rebels resulting in two rebels killed.
 February 11 – The Army deployed fresh troops in Surigao del Norte and Surigao del Sur to prevent the NPA rebels from extortioning the political candidates.
 February 16 – Six policemen were killed and 8 were wounded after 40 NPA rebels ambushed the group of Regional Public Safety Battalion in Baggao, Cagayan.
 February 18 – A police patrol car in Candoni, Negros Occidental was ambushed by NPA rebels resulting in 2 policemen dead and 4 others injured.
 February 23 – The NPA claimed responsibility for the ambush on a police patrol car in Candoni, Negros Occidental.
 February 25 – In an emailed statement, Maria Malaya, the spokesperson of the National Democratic Front said the NPA has launched 19 attacks against military troops in 4 provinces in northeastern Mindanao.
 February 20 – Troops from the 60th IB along with CAFGU members captured a bomb making factory of the NPA in Kapalong, Davao del Norte.
 February 29 – The AFP has intensified its drive to get more members of the NPA to surrender.

March 
 March 1 – The regional command center of Northern Mindanao Police Regional Office 10 has placed all field units on "full alert" status as the NPA 47th anniversary (March 29) celebration is fast-approaching and the 2016 elections is also drawing near.
 March 1 – Banana and pineapple farmers reported increased attacks by the NPA rebels on farms, facilities and equipment.
 March 7 – A raid was conducted by NPA rebels in a police station in Balangkayan, Eastern Samar. The rebels ransacked the station armory and took 16 Armalite rifles and a shotgun. They also seized 2 laptops, uniforms and personal belongings.
 March 9 – A firefight occurred between the Army and NPA rebels at around 12:00 noon in Sitio Baganao, Brgy. Kibalabag, Malaybalay City
 March 14 – A political adviser of the NPA's Guerilla Front 27 and Sub-Regional Committee 2 was arrested by the military and police authorities in Lupon, Davao Oriental.
 March 15 – A 30-minute clash occurred in Bongabong, Oriental Mindoro between elements of the 4th IB and 30 NPA fighters. The clash resulted in 5 troopers dead and 4 wounded.
 March 16 – A NPA encampment in Agusan del Norte was captured by the gov't forces after a series of gun battles which left 2 rebels killed and undetermined number of rebels wounded.
 March 17 – Nine explosions were believed to had been set off by the NPA in Masbate. Two police personnel were injured after one of the blasts struck their patrol vehicle.
 March 17 – An NPA rebel was killed and another was captured by the government troops.
 March 17 – An NPA rebel was killed and a NPA unit vice-commander was captured after a clash occurred between the 39th Infantry Battalion and NPA's Guerilla Front 72.
 March 19 – A leader of the Milisya ng Bayan of the NPA and his 12 followers surrendered to the 1001st IB at Sitio Logpaton, Brgy. Kingking, Pantukan, Compostela Valley.
 March 28 – The Philippine Army pulled out some of its troops in Guihulngan City, Negros Oriental considered a stronghold of the NPA to boost the security forces in neighboring Canlaon after a series of shootings that claimed 3 lives and injured another.
 March 28 – NPA rebels set up checkpoints in Prosperidad, Agusan del Sur and Hinatuan, Surigao del Sur.
 March 30 – Two soldiers were killed and 4 others are wounded in two separate skirmishes with the NPA rebels in Agusan del Sur and Bukidnon.
 March 30 – A rebel was killed and another was captured after a firefight in Carranglan, Nueva Ecija.

April 
 April 2 – Soldiers belonging to the 25th IB and police personnel from the Compostela Valley Police Provincial Public Safety Company (CVPPSC) engaged in a firefight with some 20 NPA rebels from the Guerilla Front 27. The firefight resulted in 1 NPA rebel killed and 12 high powered firearms recovered.
 April 2 – Two soldiers belonging to Special Task Force Masbate and 3 NPA Sparrow units clashed in a public market in Masbate City. One soldier and a NPA Sparow member was wounded. A NPA Sparow member was also arrested.
 April 3 – NPA rebels temporarily barricaded parts of the highways of Bukidnon and Misamis Oriental at 5:00 am. The rebels left 20 minutes later.
 April 3 – Two policemen were abducted by the NPA in Impasugong, Bukidnon. Three policemen and 2 soldiers are now under the custody of different NPA units after they conducted 10 roadblocks in 3 provinces.
 April 5 – A Sangguniang Bayan (SB) candidate was killed by alleged NPA guerillas in Abra after he alleged refused to pay P20,000.00 permit-to-campaign fee imposed by the rebels.
 April 6 – A soldier was wounded in a clash between troops and NPA rebels in Paluan, Occidental Mindoro.
 April 7 – A militiaman was killed by NPA rebels in Matanao, Davao del Sur.
 April 8 – A 15-minute firefight erupted in Bukidnon between government troops and armed NPA rebels. Two soldiers and undetermined number of rebels were wounded.
 April 13 – Jones, Isabela Vice Mayor Ronaldo Lucas was executed by the NPA rebels after he allegedly violated the rebel's agreement to campaign in the 2016 elections.
 April 15 – A squad of soldiers with militiamen were involved in an encounter with the group of NPA rebels in Libon, Albay. A member of the CAFGU Active Auxiliary was killed and another militiaman was wounded.
 April 16 – More than 60 NPA rebels overran the detachment of the 72nd IB in Paquibato district, Davao City. They seized 19 high-powered firearms, thousands of ammunition and 4 grenades.
 April 16 – Two militias and 5 policemen were captured by NPA rebels after a series of raids in Davao City.
 April 17 – Five soldiers were seriously wounded after their vehicle was ambushed by members of the NPA in Samar.
 April 18 – A private warehouse in Valencia, Bukidnon was ransacked by NPA rebels. The NPA seizes 1,384 sacks of rice and loaded them into four trucks. The operation was dubbed as "Operation Rice-Seizure".
 April 20 – An Army sergeant was shot down by armed men believed to be members of the NPA.
 April 21 – A soldier was abducted by 30 armed men believed to be members of the NPA.
 April 25 – Five policemen who were abducted by the NPA rebels last April 16 were freed.

May 
 May 1 – A soldier was killed after he was shot by suspected NPA members.
 May 2 – A high ranking commander of the NPA was captured by the authorities at a checkpoint in Las Nieves, Agusan del Norte.
 May 6 – Suspected NPA rebels ambushed a group of supporters of mayoralty bet Vice Mayor Melanie Uy in Jones, Isabela. Three were killed while 4 are wounded.
 May 7 – A convoy was ambushed by NPA rebels in Gamay, Northern Samar. The ambush resulted in 1 soldier dead and 4 others wounded.
 May 14 – Two soldiers were killed while 2 others are wounded in a clash with suspected NPA rebels in Toboso, Negros Occidental.
 May 19 – The NPA claimed responsibility for the killing of a retired policeman in Gingoog, Misamis Oriental.
 May 21 – Government forces seizes a NPA encampment in Lopez, Quezon.
 May 22 – Suspected NPA rebels attacked a farm workers' bunkhouse in Sagay, Negros Occidental. The attack resulted in 2 farmers killed and 2 others injured.
 May 23 – Two NPA rebels and 4 soldiers are wounded in a 2-hour firefight in Columbio, Sultan Kudarat.
 May 28 – A soldier was killed while 2 others are wounded in a firefight with NPA rebels in Escalante, Negros Occidental.
 May 29 – Suspected NPA rebels simultaneously attacked a municipal hall and a police headquarters in Davao Oriental. They also abducted the police chief of the police station.

June 
 June 3 – The US Department of State re-designates the NPA in the list of foreign terrorist organizations.
 June 3 – Two police officers died while a civilian was wounded after 3 men believed to be NPA rebels ambushed the police officers in Bulan, Sorsogon.
 June 3 – Four suspected members of NPA was arrested by the authorities in Butuan, Agusan del Norte.
 June 5 – Four people were killed in a firefight between NPA rebels and paramilitary men in Bukidnon.
 June 6 – A top leader of the NPA was arrested in Claver, Surigao del Norte.
 June 9 – Four alleged high-ranking NPA members were arrested in Butuan.
 June 10 – Two soldiers are killed after they were ambushed by suspected members of NPA in Davao Oriental.
 June 11 – Suspected NPA rebels killed 2 soldiers in Pilar, Sorsogon.
 June 15 – Suspected NPA rebels ambushed 5 policemen in Pio V. Corpuz, Masbate. One policeman was wounded as a result of the ambush.
 June 17 – A 20-minute firefight erupted in South Cotabato resulting in 2 NPA rebels killed.
 June 29 – A high-ranking NPA leader was arrested by the authorities in Compostela Valley. Meanwhile, a female NPA leader was arrested in Siaton, Negros Oriental.
 June 30 – A re-elected councilor was killed by 3 NPA rebels in Isabela, Negros Occidental.

July 
 July 1 – An NPA commander and his aide were killed during a gunfight with the military in North Cotabato.
 July 5 – A policeman was abducted by 15 suspected NPA rebels in Carmen, Surigao del Sur.
 July 5 – A clash in Bayog, Zamboanga del Sur left 2 NPA rebels and a civilian military volunteer killed.
 July 9 – Three NPA fighters were killed after a clash with government forces near Mauban, Quezon.
 July 12 – A two-hour firefight near Atimonan, Quezon left one soldier and one NPA fighter dead and 5 soldiers injured, according to Army officials.
 July 27 – One government militia member was killed and 4 others were injured after an NPA ambush in Davao Del Norte, just two days after President Rodrigo Duterte declared a unilateral ceasefire.

August 
 August 5 – A group of 40 suspected NPA members in Apayao burned three trucks belonging to a company which refused to pay protection money.
 August 6 – An elite soldier from the Philippines' Army was killed during a clash in Bukidnon, with the NPA suffering an unknown number of casualties.
 August 9 – The Communist Party of the Philippines issued a statement, ordering its armed wing (NPA) to intensify its attacks in the countryside, despite peace talks with the government being weeks away.
 August 19 – Three government militiamen were wounded after NPA fighters 'harassed' their detachment near Laiya Aplaya, San Juan, Batangas.
 August 19 – Four NPA members were killed after an attempted ambush near San Luis, Agusan del Sur.
 August 20 – The ceasefire between government forces and CPP-NPA took effect across the country, with troops returning to barracks and combat operations ceasing.
 August 26 – Rebels released a police officer from Tandag City, Surigao del Sur who had been abducted on July 5.

References 

2016 in the Philippines